Ingrid Anna Thyssen (born 9 September 1956 in Aachen) is a retired West German javelin thrower.

Competition Results
She finished seventh at the 1978 European Championships. 

She competed at the 1983 World Championships without reaching the final. 

She finished sixth at the 1984 Summer Olympics.

She seventh at the 1986 European Championships.

She finished ninth at the 1987 World Championships.

She finished eighth at the 1988 Summer Olympics.

She finished sixth at the 1990 European Championships.

West German Champion
She became West German champion eight times, in the years 1979-1984, 1987, and 1988.

Club Teams
She represented the clubs TG Aachen, ASV Köln, and LG Bayer Leverkusen.

Personal Best Throw
Her personal best throw was 69.68 metres with the old javelin type, achieved in August 1987 in West Berlin. 

This ranks her eighth among German old-type-javelin throwers, behind Petra Felke (who held the world record), Antje Kempe, Silke Renk, Beate Koch, Karen Forkel, Tanja Damaske, and Ruth Fuchs.

References

External links

Living people
1956 births
Sportspeople from Aachen
West German female javelin throwers
Athletes (track and field) at the 1984 Summer Olympics
Athletes (track and field) at the 1988 Summer Olympics
Olympic athletes of West Germany
TG Aachen athletes
ASV Köln athletes
LG Bayer Leverkusen athletes